Hopeful is an unincorporated community located in Mitchell County, Georgia, United States.

History
The community was so named on account of the first settlers' "hopeful" spirit.

Geography
Hopeful sits at the intersection of Georgia Highway 65 and River Road. Georgia Highway 97, Colonial Road, Firetower Road, Broomsedge Road, Hopeful Park Road, and Willie Curtis Road also run through the area.

References

Unincorporated communities in Mitchell County, Georgia
Unincorporated communities in Georgia (U.S. state)